Athyrium filix-femina, the lady fern or common lady-fern, is a large, feathery species of fern native to temperate Asia, Europe, North Africa, Canada and the USA. It is often abundant (one of the more common ferns) in damp, shady woodland environments and is often grown for decoration.

Its common names "lady fern" and "female fern" refer to how its reproductive structures (sori) are concealed in an inconspicuous – deemed "female" – manner on the frond. Alternatively, it is said to be feminine because of its elegant and graceful appearance.

Characteristics

Athyrium filix-femina is now commonly split into three species, typical A. filix-femina, A. angustum (narrow lady fern) and A. asplenioides (southern lady fern). 

Athyrium filix-femina is cespitose (the fronds arising from a central point as a clump rather than along a rhizome). Sori appear as dots on the underside of the frond, 1–6 per pinnule. They are covered by a prominently whitish to brown reniform (kidney-shaped) indusium. Fronds are very dissected, being 3-pinnate. The stipe may bear long, pale brown, papery scales at the base. The spores are yellow on A. angustum and dark brown on A. asplenioides.

A. filix-femina is very hardy, tolerating temperatures as low as  throughout its range.'

Cultivation and uses
Numerous cultivars have been developed for garden use, of which the following have gained the Royal Horticultural Society's Award of Garden Merit:
A. filix-femina 'Vernoniae'
A. filix-femina 'Frizelliae'

The young fronds are edible after cooking; Native Americans cooked both the fiddleheads and the rhizomes.

References

Further reading
Hyde, H. A., Wade, A. E., & Harrison, S. G. (1978). Welsh Ferns. National Museum of Wales.

External links

Plants for a Future: Athyrium filix-femina

filix-femina
Ferns of the Americas
Ferns of Asia
Ferns of Europe
Ferns of the United States
Flora of Ontario
Flora of Europe
Flora of North America
Flora of Asia
Plants described in 1753
Taxa named by Carl Linnaeus